The Uttarkashi–Palar Yamunotri Railway, notified as the project of national strategic importance, is Indian Railways's one of the four constituent routes of the proposed Char Dham Railway connecting the holiest Chota Char Dham of Hinduism. This 22 km route starts from
Uttarkashi and ends at Palar near Yamunotri.

Railway routes
The 22 km route starts from a "Y" fork at Uttarkashi off Doiwala–Dehradun–Uttarkashi–Maneri Gangotri Railway and ends near Yamunotri at Palar 1265 m above mean sea level.

Current status
Char Dham Railway project's 327 km long construction, costing INR ₹43,292 crore (USD $6.6 billion), began with the foundation stone laying and commencement of INR ₹120 crore Final Location Survey (FSL) in May 2017 by the Union Railway minister Suresh Prabhu.

See also

 Doiwala–Dehradun–Uttarkashi–Maneri Gangotri Railway
 Saikot–Joshimath Badrinath Railway
 Karnaprayag–Saikot–Sonprayag Kedarnath Railway
 Rishikesh–Karnaprayag Railway
 Diamond Quadrilateral railway project
 Golden Quadrilateral road project
 Setu Bharatam railway crossing-free flyover and underpass project

References

Rail transport in Uttarakhand

Proposed railway lines in India
Uttarkashi